Stenanona panamensis is a species of plant in the Annonaceae family. It is found in Costa Rica and Panama. It is threatened by habitat loss.

References

Annonaceae
Endangered plants
Flora of Costa Rica
Flora of Panama
Taxonomy articles created by Polbot